Bicyclus makomensis is a butterfly in the family Nymphalidae. It is found in southern Cameroon, mainland Equatorial Guinea and most of Gabon.

References

Elymniini
Butterflies described in 1913
Endemic fauna of Cameroon
Butterflies of Africa